Leonard Stall (born in London on 8 February 1961) is a media entrepreneur and author, very active in the charity and philanthropy sectors.

Education 
Stall graduated from The University of Birmingham in Birmingham, United Kingdom in 1982 and was a Press Fellow at Wolfson College, Cambridge (1993).

He was awarded an Honorary Doctorate (DUniv) from The University of Birmingham, United Kingdom, in 2019.

Career 
Stall founded Medialab in 1992, where he was responsible for launching and selling a portfolio of magazine and newspaper titles including The Sussex and South Coast edition of The Metro daily newspaper, The Source, Brighton and Hove Life, Business Edge, Retail Express and others. During his time with Medialab, he also launched an online portal for retailers, thelocalshop.com and was a presenter on a national radio show called Early Edition, initially on the GWR network, and then broadcast at breakfast-time on the UK’s nationwide Talk Radio.

In 2004, he was appointed as Chairman of the Sussex branch of the Institute of Directors and was also on the SE Regional Committee. He remained in this role until 2007.

In 2008, he joined Touchline as its Group CEO and Editor-in-Chief.

From 2010-2017, at Touchline, he was the Editor-in-Chief of Vision magazine.

He was also the Editor-in-Chief of the book How to do Good – Essays on Building a Better World. It was featured in the Dubai Festival of Literature, the York Festival of Ideas and at The University of Birmingham, Stockholm University, City Hall London, The Lincoln Center New York City, and in Oslo, Brussels, The Hague and Paris in 2017.

In 2017, he was appointed as the Executive Chairman of Touchline.

In 2020 he opened two new media and communications companies, Medialab London Ltd in the United Kingdom, and Just Reports B.V in the Netherlands.

Philanthropy
In addition to his roles as both the founder and Editor-in-Chief of Philanthropy Age, a grantee project of the Bill and Melinda Gates Foundation, and the How to do Good book and speaker tour, Stall led the creation of an independent International Code of Practice for Non-Profit Organisations, a process managed by British Standards Institution (BSI) and co-sponsored by Philanthropy Age and social enterprise Insaan Group, of which he is also a board member. 

Stall is an Advisory Board Member for Rosalynn Carter’s Fellowships for Mental Health Journalism in UAE.

He is a consultant to the Norwegian Nobel Institute.

Stall is the chairman of Charity Futures, the UK third sector think-tank working with New College at the University of Oxford to launch the forthcoming Gradel Institute of Charity. This is scheduled to open in 2023 in a custom-built tower on New College Quad.

He also sits on the Global Advisory Board of the Institute of Global Innovation at The University of Birmingham and on the Advisory Board of the University of Birmingham in Dubai..

Bibliography 
  
 
 
 
 
Stall, Leonard (2020) Conversations about the Planet and our Future. 
Stall, Leonard (2020) Conversations about People and our Future. 
Stall, Leonard (2021) Conversations about Innovation and our Future. 
Stall, Leonard (2022) Conversations about our Future.

Other Appointments and memberships 
Chairman of Trustees of UK publishing organisation, ACE
Fellow Institute of Directors
Memberships: MCC, Reform Club, Ivy Club
Chairman of the Sussex branch of the Institute of Directors,member SE Regional Committee 2004-2007
Member of Court University of Sussex 2004-2007
Steering Committee for the Theatre Royal Brighton's 200th Birthday 2007
Trustee Martlets Hospice, Brighton 2005-2007

References 

1961 births
Living people
British writers